Strikeforce: Lawler vs. Shields was a mixed martial arts event held by the MMA organization Strikeforce.  It was held in St. Louis, Missouri on June 6, 2009. The event drew an estimated 275,000 viewers on Showtime.

Background
Strikeforce Heavyweight Champion Alistair Overeem injured his hand and was unable to fight at this event. He was replaced by Andrei Arlovski.

Renato Sobral was scheduled to face Rafael Cavalcante, but after suffering an injury, was replaced by Mike Kyle.

Results

See also
 Strikeforce (mixed martial arts)
 List of Strikeforce champions
 List of Strikeforce events
 2009 in Strikeforce

References

External links
 Strikeforce Homepage

Lawler vs. Shields
2009 in mixed martial arts
Mixed martial arts in Missouri
Events in St. Louis
Sports in St. Louis
2009 in sports in Missouri